Sida acuta, the common wireweed, is a species of flowering plant in the mallow family, Malvaceae.  It is believed to have originated in Central America, but today has a pantropical distribution and is considered a weed in some areas.

In northern Australia, Sida acuta is considered an invasive species, and the beetle Calligrapha pantherina has been introduced as a biological control agent in an attempt to control the plant.

Description

Plant 
Undershrub, with mucilaginous juice, aerial, erect, cylindrical, branched, solid, green.

Leaves 
Alternate, simple, lanceolate to linear, rarely ovate to oblong, obtuse at the base, acute at the apex, coarsely and remotely serrate; petiole much shorter than the blade; stipulate, stipules free-lateral, unequally paired at the node, reticulate venation.

Inflorescence 
Cymose

Flower 
Small, axillary, 2–3 in a cluster; pedicels jointed at the middle, epicalyx absent, complete, bisexual, regular, actinomorphic, hypogynus, pentamerous, yellow.

Calyx 
Sepals: five, gamosepalous, campanulate, slightly accrescent, persistent, valvate.

Corolla 
Petals: five, polypetalous but slightly connate below and jointed with the staminal column, twisted.

Androecium 
Stamens many, monadelphous, arranged  on the staminal column; staminal column is shorter than the petals, divided above into numerous filaments, anthers monothecous, reniform, basifixed, filament short, extrorse. Pollen are spherical with spikes, size is approximately 90 microns.

Gynoecium 
Carples: five, syncarpous, ovary superior, penta or multilocular with axile placentation, one ovule in each locule; style 1, passing through the staminal tube; stigma globular, correspond to the number of carpels.

Fruit 
A schizocarpic mericarp, seed 1 in each mericarp.

Classification and identification (Bentham and Hooker's system)

Class: Dicotyledonae 
I) Reticulate venation.

II) Flower pentamerous.

Sub-class: Polypetalae 
I) Petals free.

Series: Thalamiflorae 
I) Flower hypogynus; ovary superior.

Order: Malvales 
I) Stamens indefinite, monadelphous.

II) Ovary 5 carpellary, placentation axile.

Family: Malvaceae 
I) Plant: mucilaginous.

II) Leaves: simple with free lateral stipule.

III) Flower: bisexual, petals: five, twisted; monadelphous stamen, anther one-celled, reniform.

Genus: Sida 
I) Staminal column without teeth at apex.

II) Flowers without epicalyx.

III) Ovule 1 in each locule; seed 1 in each mericarp.

Species: S.acuta 
I) Leaf base obtuse, apex acute.

Floral formula of Sida acuta 
Br,+,K⁵,C⁵^,A_,G(⁵)

Names

Vernacular name 

 Sanskrit: 
 Bengali:  (in Tripura)
 Hindi: 
 Odia (Oriya): 
 Gujrati: 
 Marathi: 
 Malayalam: 
 Tamil: 
 Telugu: 
 Kannada: 
 Sinhala: 
 Burmese: 
 Yoruba:

References
5. S. acuta Burm.f.(Fl. ind. 147. 1768) emend.  K.Schum. Fl. Bras. 12: 326. 1891. 1: 15. t. 2. 1785; Sub.  sp. acuta. Cav. Diss. Roxb. Fl. Ind. 3; 171. 1832; Prain. Beng. Pl. I: 259. 1903; Heinig, Enum. 90. 1907; Gamble, Fl. Pres. Madras 90. 1915; Haines, Bot. Bih. Or. 61. 1925; Borss. in Blumea 14 (1: 187. 1966)    S.carpinifolia sensu Masters in Hook. f. Fl. Brit. Ind. 1: 323. 1874. non L. f. ; Kanjilal et al. Fl. Assam 1(1) : 140. 1934; S.carpinifolia var. acuta   (Burm. f)   Kurz in Journ. Asiat. Soc. Beng. II. 45(2) : 119. 1876; S. scoparia Lour. Fl. Cochinch. 114. 1790; S. lanceolata Retz. Obs. Bot. 4: 28. 1786; Roxb. Fl. Ind. 3: 175. 1832; S. stauntoniana DC. Prodr. 1: 460. 1824;  S.paucifolia DC. Prodr. 1: 472. 1824; S. acuta var. intermedia Hu,Fl. China(Fam.153) : 19. 1955; Deb. D.B . Fl. Tripura 1: 306. 1981.

Flora of South America
Flora of Central America
Flora of Asia
Flora naturalised in Australia
Plants described in 1768
acuta
Pantropical flora
Taxa named by Nicolaas Laurens Burman